

The Caspar C 29 was a 2-seat floatplane mail carrier and reconnaissance developed in Germany, but built by Dansk Aero in Denmark in the mid-1920s.

Design and development
The C 29 was intended to take part in the 1926 Deutschen Seeflugwettbewerb at Warnemünde, but crashed a few days before the competition.

Specifications

References

C029
Biplanes
Single-engined tractor aircraft
Aircraft first flown in 1926